The 1960 United States Senate election in Mississippi was held on November 8, 1960. 

Incumbent Senator James Eastland was re-elected to a fourth term in office against nominal opposition. The primary race attracted little attention and as was typical of elections in the South at this time, the general election was a foregone conclusion in favor of the Democratic candidate, Eastland.

Democratic primary

Candidates

Declared
 Ance Blakeney, former Smith County Supervisor
 James Eastland, incumbent Senator

Withdrew
 Wayne McClure, Hattiesburg resident

Results

Republican primary

Candidates
 Joe A. Moore, Pascagoula attorney

Results
Moore was unopposed for the Republican nomination.

General election

Results

See also 
 1960 United States Senate elections

References 

1960
Mississippi
United States Senate